Kaagar is a 2019 Indian Marathi-language Romantic political thriller film directed by Makarand Mane and produced by Viacom18 Studios and Udaharnarth Nirmit in association with Bahuroopi Productions. The film stars Rinku Rajguru, Shashank Shende, Shubhankar Tawde in lead roles. It was scheduled to be theatrically released on 26 April 2019.

Cast 

 Rinku Rajguru as Rani
 Shubhankar Tawde as Yuvraj Kadam
 Shashank Shende as Guruji/Prabhakar Rao Deshmukh 
 Suhas Palshikar as Aabasaheb Gaikwad 
 Bharati Patil as Rani's mother
 Umesh Jagtap as Inspector Yogesh Nikam 
 Millind Pathak as Shailesh Rao Gupta
 Shatanu Gangane as Bhaiyasaheb/Bhujang Gaikwad 
 Vitthal Kale as Bhavdya 
 Vitthal Patil as Qawwali performer 
 Yogesh Nikam as Kavval
 Mahesh Bhosale as Amar

Production 
Kaagar is produced by Viacom18 Studios and Udaharnarth Nirmit in association with Bahuroopi Productions. As the story of the film focuses on rural areas, the film was shot in Akluj and nearby rural areas of town.

Soundtrack 

Music and background score is given by A.V. Prafullachandra. Songs are recorded by Kavita Ram, Vivek Naik, Rahul Chitnis, Santosh Bote, Jasraj Joshi, Rucha Bondre, Shashaa Tirupati, Harshavardhan Wavare, Adarsh Shinde, Pravin Kunwar, Amaan Khaan, Jazim Sharma, Amruta Subhash, Manish Rajgire. Lyrics by Vaibhav Deshmukh.

Release 
Kaagar was scheduled to be theatrically released on 26 April 2019 and available to streaming on Netflix. Initially film was released on 7 February 2019 but pushed due to production.

Reception 
Kaagar received mixed reviews from critics. Shalmesh More of Koimoi rated it 3.5 out of 5 and praised the strong performances and direction. Criticized for trying to retain specific treatment, even explaining that some scenes go over the top. The music of the film is very loud, especially in the action sequences. Also the background score goes overboard. Nandini Ramnath of Scroll.in wrote "The film doesn't know how to deal with Rani and the talented actress for her role.  Rani's bitter choice between love and duty falls by the wayside as Kagar runs into a scandal that no one saw coming because in the real world don't things end like that?  The opening credits declare that Rinku Rajguru has been “reintroduced” by Kaagar, but despite getting top billing, Rani slips to the bottom of the pile.  Rajguru is still at large, but this time there is no clear direction." Ibrahim Afgan of Maharashtra Times gave 2.5 out of 5 and criticised shallowness of characters, ignorance of subject matter, and clumsiness of story limits this movie. From background music to acting, its immaturity makes the film mediocre. A new political leadership in the new era is a good subject, but it needs not only the will but also the right support. This error has made this an artifact common. Chitrali Chogale of Times Now Marathi gave 2.5 out of 5 and wrote "An only daughter of a spacious political family and her lover from a poor house, he is accompanied by his two friends and the difficulties faced by this love, is somewhere back to the plot of Sairat movie, but the movie does not make that much impact. The uniqueness of Rinku's character, the broken story in the film and the stretched story towards the end, at least if these things were played out, the film would have been effective. The Times of India gave 2.5 out of 5 and addressed as average experience.

References

External links 
  
 Kaagar at Rotten Tomatoes 
 Kaagar at Viacom18 Studios

2019 films
Indian political drama films
Indian political films
Indian political thriller films
Indian romantic thriller films
2010s Marathi-language films